ECML PKDD, the European Conference on Machine Learning and Principles and Practice of Knowledge Discovery in Databases, is one of the leading academic conferences on machine learning and knowledge discovery, held in Europe every year.

History
ECML PKDD is a merger of two European conferences, European Conference on Machine Learning (ECML) and European Conference on Principles and Practice of Knowledge Discovery in Databases (PKDD). ECML and PKDD have been co-located since 2001; however, both ECML and PKDD retained their own identity until 2007. For example, the 2007 conference was known as "the 18th European Conference on Machine Learning (ECML) and the 11th European Conference
on Principles and Practice of Knowledge Discovery in Databases (PKDD)", or in brief, "ECML/PKDD 2007", and both ECML and PKDD had their own conference proceedings. In 2008 the conferences were merged into one conference, and the division into traditional ECML topics and traditional PKDD topics was removed.

The history of ECML dates back to 1986, when the European Working Session on Learning was first held. In 1993 the name of the conference was changed to European Conference on Machine Learning.

PKDD was first organised in 1997. Originally PKDD stood for the European Symposium on Principles of Data Mining and Knowledge Discovery from Databases. The name European Conference on Principles and Practice of Knowledge Discovery in Databases was used since 1999.

Upcoming conferences

List of past conferences

References

External links
 
 ECML proceedings information in DBLP.
 PKDD proceedings information in DBLP.

Artificial intelligence conferences